Martin John Earwicker  (born 11 May 1948) was Director of the National Museum of Science and Industry group of British museums (including the Science Museum, the National Railway Museum, and the National Media Museum) from 2006 until 2009.  Prior to taking on this role, he was Chief Executive of the Defence Science and Technology Laboratory (Dstl).

Earwicker graduated with a degree in physics from the University of Surrey. He previously worked as Managing Director of the Defence Evaluation and Research Agency and head of Science and Engineering at the Office of Science and Technology‚ part of the Department of Trade and Industry. He was elected a Fellow of the Royal Academy of Engineering in 2000.

From April 2009 until 2013, Earwicker was Vice-Chancellor of London South Bank University, replacing Deian Hopkin on his retirement.

References

External links
 

1948 births
Alumni of the University of Surrey
British chief executives
Directors of the Science Museum, London
Fellows of the Royal Academy of Engineering
Living people
Vice-Chancellors of London South Bank University